Cameron Walker (born November 10, 1992) is a professional Canadian football defensive lineman who is currently a free agent. He was most recently a member of the BC Lions of the Canadian Football League (CFL). He played CIS football for the Guelph Gryphons. Walker has also been a member of the Toronto Argonauts, Hamilton Tiger-Cats, and Ottawa Redblacks.

Early life

Cameron Walker was born in London, Ontario and played college football at the University of Guelph where he registered 108 total tackles, 12 sacks and three forced fumbles in 31 games.

Professional career

Toronto Argonauts 
Walker was drafted by the Toronto Argonauts in the third round, 21st overall, in the 2015 CFL Draft and signed with the team on May 26, 2015. He played in his first professional game on August 14, 2015 against the Winnipeg Blue Bombers. He played in 35 games during his first stint with the Argonauts and was a member of the 105th Grey Cup championship team.

Ottawa Redblacks 
On February 15, 2018, Walker signed with the Ottawa Redblacks. He was released by the Redblacks prior to the season on May 19, 2018.

Toronto Argonauts (II) 
Walker re-signed with the Toronto Argonauts on May 29, 2018. He played in all 18 regular season games and recorded his first career sack on October 20, 2018 against the Montreal Alouettes. He re-signed with the Argonauts during the following off-season on February 12, 2019, but was part of the final training camp cuts on June 8, 2019.

Hamilton Tiger-Cats 
Two days after being released by Toronto, on June 10, 2019, Walker signed as a free agent with the Hamilton Tiger-Cats. He played in eight games in 2019 before being released on August 20, 2019.

Ottawa Redblacks (II) 
Walker signed onto the practice roster of the Ottawa Redblacks on September 10, 2019. He played in four regular season games for the team but was released during the following off-season on January 23, 2020.

BC Lions 
On February 11, 2020, Walker signed a one-year contract with the BC Lions. However, the 2020 CFL season was cancelled and his contract expired on February 9, 2021.

Business ventures

Brick Technology Canada 
During 2021, Walker founded Brick Canada together with his brother Braedy. The company is a regional arm of the Swedish tech startup Brick Technology and offers powerbank sharing services through its mobile application.

References

External links
BC Lions bio

Living people
1992 births
Canadian football defensive linemen
Guelph Gryphons football players
Players of Canadian football from Ontario
Sportspeople from London, Ontario
Toronto Argonauts players
Hamilton Tiger-Cats players
Ottawa Redblacks players
BC Lions players